The New Look is the debut studio album by Fontella Bass released on Checker Records 2997. It contains her biggest hit, "Rescue Me".  The album also charted on the pop albums chart, being listed for 8 weeks, with a highest position of #93.

Track listing
"Rescue Me"
"Soul of the Man"
"I Know"
"Gee Whiz" (Carla Thomas)
"I'm a Woman"
"Our Day Will Come"
"Impossible"
"Oh No Not My Baby"
"You've Lost That Lovin' Feelin''"
"How Glad I Am"
"Since I Fell for You"
"Come and Get These Memories"

References

Fontella Bass albums
1966 debut albums
Chess Records albums
Checker Records albums